Jerzy Władysław Jurka (June 4, 1950 – July 19, 2014) was a Polish-American computational and molecular biologist.  He served as the assistant director of research at the Linus Pauling Institute prior to founding the Genetic Information Research Institute. He collaborated with several notable scientists including Linus Pauling, George Irving Bell, Roy Britten, Temple Smith, and Emile Zuckerkandl. His Erdős number is 3, using the path through Temple Smith and Stanislaw Ulam.

Research
Dr. Jurka is best known for his work on eukaryotic transposable elements (TEs), including the discovery of the major families of Alu elements. He also proposed the mechanism of Alu proliferation and discovered their paternal transmission. The majority of known types of class II TEs, or DNA transposons, were discovered or co-discovered by his team at the Genetic Information Research Institute, based on DNA sequence analysis. The first one, reported in 2001 with Vladimir Kapitonov,  became known as Helitron, which is playing a major role in genomic evolution.
In 2006 they reported a study of a new,  self-synthesizing transposable element  called Polinton or Maverick, which is present many diverse eukaryotes. More recently, Jurka and his co-workers presented a hypothesis that links the origin of repetitive families (TE families), to population subdivision and speciation based on classical concepts of population genetics.

Jerzy Jurka is the founder of Repbase , which he developed since 1990 with his team and other contributors. Repbase is the primary reference database of TEs used in DNA annotation and analysis.

References

1950 births
2014 deaths
Polish molecular biologists
American molecular biologists